Simon Pollard Hughes, Jr. (April 14, 1830 – June 29, 1906) was an American lawyer, jurist, and politician who served as the 15th governor of Arkansas from 1885 to 1889. He previously served as an officer of the Confederate States Army in the Western and Trans-Mississippi theaters of the American Civil War.

Early life and education
Simon Pollard Hughes, Jr. was born in Smith County, Tennessee, the son of Simon P. Hughes and Mary Hubbard Hughes. Hughes Sr., originally from Prince Edward County, Virginia, was a farmer, sheriff and a member of the Tennessee legislature from 1842–1843, Mary Hubbard was a native of Oglethorpe County, Georgia. In 1842, Mary Hughes died and the family moved to Bowie County, Texas. Hughes Sr. died in Texas in 1844, making Hughes at orphan at the age of fourteen.

Hughes moved to Arkansas in December 1849, and was educated at Sylvan Academy and Clinton College in Tennessee. In 1853, Hughes was elected sheriff of Monroe County, Arkansas and served for two years. Hughes was admitted to the bar in Arkansas in 1857, and started private practice in Clarendon, Arkansas. During the American Civil War, he was elected captain in the 23d Arkansas Infantry of the Confederate States Army rising to the rank of lieutenant-colonel. Later in the war, following a reorganization of the 23d Arkansas, Hughes enlisted as a private in Charles L. Morgan's Independent Texas Cavalry unit.

Political career
Following the war, Hughes served in the Arkansas House of Representatives from 1866 to 1867, and was a delegate to the 1874 Arkansas constitutional convention. He was elected to the post of Arkansas Attorney General and served from 1874 to 1877. He was elected governor of Arkansas, being sworn-in, in January 1885. He was reelected in 1886. During his terms, public executions were abolished in Arkansas and the sale of liquor was restricted. In 1889, he was elected to the Arkansas supreme court as an associate justice and served in that capacity for sixteen years.

Death
Hughes died in Little Rock, Arkansas, and is buried in historic Mount Holly Cemetery at Little Rock.

References

External links

 
 Simon Pollard Hughes Jr. at the National Governors Association
 Simon Pollard Hughes Jr. at The Political Graveyard

1830 births
1906 deaths
19th-century American judges
19th-century American lawyers
19th-century American politicians
American lawyers admitted to the practice of law by reading law
Arkansas Attorneys General
Arkansas Democrats
Arkansas lawyers
Arkansas sheriffs
Arkansas Whigs
Clinton College (Tennessee)
Confederate States Army officers
Democratic National Committee people
Democratic Party governors of Arkansas
Governors of Arkansas
Justices of the Arkansas Supreme Court
Members of the Arkansas House of Representatives
People from Monroe County, Arkansas
People from Smith County, Tennessee
People of Arkansas in the American Civil War